"Speak No Evil" is a song by New Zealand band Dragon released in February 1985 as the lead single from the group's eighth studio album  Dreams of Ordinary Men. The song peaked at number 19 on the Australian Kent Music Report.

Track listing 
 "Speak No Evil" (Johanna Pigott, Alan Mansfield, Todd Hunter) - 4:00
 "Witnessing" (Marc Hunter, Todd Hunter) - 4:42

Charts

References 

Dragon (band) songs
1985 singles
1984 songs
Polydor Records singles
Songs written by Todd Hunter
Songs written by Johanna Pigott